Crystal Bradford (born November 1, 1993) is an American professional basketball player for AZS Poznań of the Polish league Basket Liga Kobiet. A star college player at Central Michigan University, she made history being the first player in the CMU program to ever be drafted to the WNBA. She was drafted by the Los Angeles Sparks in the 2015 WNBA draft.

High school career
Crystal Bradford attended Inkster High School and was rated as the No. 37 prospect in the nation by ESPN, the ninth-best guard ... named Class A all-state special mention by the Basketball Coaches Association of Michigan and second team all-state by the Detroit Free Press and Detroit News as a junior ... earned Class B all-state honors from the Associated Press, second-team all-state honors from the Detroit News and third-team all-state honors from the Detroit Free Press as a sophomore ... earned second-team All-Detroit honors from the Detroit Free Press and first team honors from the Detroit News as a sophomore ... was rated the No. 15 player in the country entering her junior year.

College career
Bradford finished her college career as CMU's all-time leader in points (2,006), rebounds (1,140), made field goals (805) and blocks (177). She was the first CMU player to be drafted in the WNBA Draft.

Freshman year
Bradford entered Central Michigan University in 2011. As a  freshman Bradford proved she was a star, ending her freshman year with ground breaking numbers. Bradford earned Mid-American Conference (MAC) Honorable mention honors and was named to the MAC All-Freshmen Team ... started 19 games as a freshman while appearing in 32 ... led the team in scoring (14.2), rebounds (8.4), blocks (57) and steals (69) ... finished the season with 11 double-doubles ... scored in double digits in all but five games with, including a season-high 27 at Northern Illinois (1/5) ... had a season-high 17 rebounds against South Florida (11/23) ... posted a season-high five blocks and five steals against Western Michigan (1/11) ... named to the Carrs-Safeway Great Alaska Shootout All-Tournament Team and set the tournament record for most blocks (6) ... recorded three straight double-doubles in the Mid-American Conference Tournament while finishing with a 16.4 points per game average and 10.6 rebounds ... set the tournament record for most field goals made (36), field goals attempted (80) and rebounds (53) ... was named to the MAC All-Tournament Team ... was named MAC West Player of the Week for the Week of Nov. 28th and Dec. 26th ... recorded the second most points and rebounds by a freshman at CMU ... posted the fifth most field goals made in a season at 193 ... 69 total steals were ninth most in the CMU single-season history ... has the second-most blocks in a single season at 57.

Professional career

United States 
Bradford was drafted by the Los Angeles Sparks with the 7th pick in the 2015 WNBA draft. She appeared in 15 games during the 2015 season, averaging 2.7 points per game.

During the summer of 2017, she played for the Flint Lady Monarchs of the Global Women's Basketball Association, helping the team win the GWBA title while being named the Finals MVP.

In April 2021, Bradford signed with the Atlanta Dream. On 24 August 2021, Bradford sustained a Jones fracture in her right foot and missed the reminder of the season. For the season she averaged 8.8 points and 3.8 rebounds. In October 2021, it was reported that the Dream would not resign Bradford after a footage of her involvement in a fight outside of a club in Atlanta in May 2021 circulated on social media.

In February 2022, Bradford signed with the Chicago Sky.

Overseas 
In January 2016, Bradford signed with Vimpelin Veto of the Naisten Korisliiga. In 11 games she averaged 15.8 points and 10.1 rebounds per game.

She played for Israel club Elitzur Holon during the 2017–2018 season. In 26 games, she averaged 19.6 points 13.7 rebounds, 4.3 assists and 1.5 steals helping Elitzur to both league and Cup finals.

In May 2018, Bradford signed with Bnot Hertzeliya. In 23 games for the club, she averaged 22.1 points and 14.5 rebounds.

During the 2020-2021 season, she played first played for Beşiktaş JK where she averaged 20.2 points, 10.9 rebounds, 3.8 assists and 2.0 steals in 19 games. She later signed with Ramat Hasharon, where she averaged 19.3 points, 9.8 rebounds, 3.5 assists and 2.5 steals in 11 games.

In May 2021, Bradford signed to play for Basket Liga Kobiet club AZS Poznań for the 2021–2022 season.

Statistics

College statistics
Source

References

External links
WNBA.com: Prospect: Crystal Bradford

Profile at Eurobasket.com
Finnish statistics at Basket.fi

1993 births
Living people
Atlanta Dream players
Basketball players from Detroit
Central Michigan Chippewas women's basketball players
Guards (basketball)
Los Angeles Sparks draft picks
Los Angeles Sparks players
Medalists at the 2013 Summer Universiade
People from Inkster, Michigan
Universiade gold medalists for the United States
Universiade medalists in basketball